The Chesapeake and Potomac Telephone Company, Old Main Building is a historic structure located in Downtown Washington, D.C.  It was listed on the National Register of Historic Places in 1988.

History
As the number of businesses in Washington increasingly relied in telephone service, Chesapeake and Potomac Telephone Company built this building as its new main exchange.  Designed by architect Leon Eidlitz, it was the first of a complex of buildings the company would construct at this site.  The building houses what was considered to be the largest telephone switchboard at the time.  It began operations in September 1904 and served 6,000 at the beginning.  The new system eliminated the multiple rings on party lines and the need for an operator to interrupt the line to determine whether a subscriber had completed a call or wanted to receive calls.

See also
Chesapeake and Potomac Telephone Company Building
Chesapeake and Potomac Telephone Company Warehouse and Repair Facility

References

Commercial buildings completed in 1904
Telecommunications buildings on the National Register of Historic Places
Commercial buildings on the National Register of Historic Places in Washington, D.C.